P. leptochila may refer to:

 Partula leptochila, an extinct snail
 Pterostylis leptochila, a terrestrial orchid